Pangaea Proxima (also called Pangaea Ultima, Neopangaea, and Pangaea II) is a possible future supercontinent configuration. Consistent with the supercontinent cycle, Pangaea Proxima could occur within the next 200 million years. This potential configuration, hypothesized by Christopher Scotese in November 1982, earned its name from its similarity to the previous Pangaea supercontinent. Scotese later changed Pangaea Ultima (Last Pangaea) to Pangaea Proxima (Next Pangaea) to alleviate confusion about the name Pangaea Ultima which could imply that it would be the last supercontinent. The concept was based on examination of past cycles of formation and breakup of supercontinents, not on current understanding of the mechanisms of tectonic change, which are too imprecise to project that far into the future.  "It's all pretty much fantasy to start with," Scotese has said. "But it's a fun exercise to think about what might happen.  And you can only do it if you have a really clear idea of why things happen in the first place."

Supercontinents describe the merger of all, or nearly all, of Earth's landmass into a single contiguous continent. In the Pangaea Proxima scenario, subduction at the western Atlantic, east of the Americas, leads to the subduction of the Atlantic mid-ocean ridge followed by subduction destroying the Atlantic and Indian basin, causing the Atlantic and Indian Oceans to close, bringing the Americas back together with Africa and Europe. As with most supercontinents, the interior of Pangaea Proxima would probably become a semi-arid desert prone to extreme temperatures.

Formation
According to the Pangaea Proxima hypothesis, the Atlantic and Indian Oceans will continue to get wider until new subduction zones bring the continents back together, forming a future Pangaea. Most continents and microcontinents are predicted to collide with Eurasia, just as they did when most continents collided with Laurentia.

Around 50 million years from now, North America is predicted to shift west and Eurasia would shift to the east, and possibly even to the south, bringing Great Britain closer to the North Pole and Siberia southward towards warm, subtropical latitudes. Africa is predicted to collide with Europe and Arabia, closing the Mediterranean Sea (thus completely closing the Tethys Ocean (or Neotethys)) and the Red Sea. A long mountain range (the Mediterranean Mountain Range) would then extend from Iberia, across Southern Europe and into Asia. Some are even predicted to have peaks higher than Mount Everest. Similarly, Australia is predicted to beach itself past the doorstep of Southeast Asia, causing the islands to be compressed inland, forming another potential mountain range. Meanwhile, Southern and Baja California are predicted to have already collided with Alaska with new mountain ranges formed between them.

About 125 million years from now, the Atlantic Ocean is predicted to stop widening and begin to shrink because the Mid-Atlantic Ridge will have been subducted. In this scenario, a mid-ocean ridge between South America and Africa will probably be subducted first; the Atlantic Ocean is predicted to have narrowed as a result of subduction beneath the Americas.  The Indian Ocean is also predicted to be smaller due to northward subduction of oceanic crust into the Central Indian trench. Antarctica is expected to split into two and shift northwards, colliding with Madagascar and Australia, enclosing a remnant of the Indian Ocean, which Scotese calls the "Medi-Pangaean Sea".

When the last of the Mid-Atlantic Ridge is subducted beneath the Americas, the Atlantic Ocean is predicted to close rapidly.

At 250 million years in the future, the Atlantic is predicted to have closed, with only small vestiges of the former ocean remaining. North America is predicted to have collided with Africa, but be in a more southerly position than where it rifted away during the Mesozoic. South America is predicted to be wrapped around the southern tip of Africa and Antarctica, completely enclosing the Medi-Pangaean Sea, which becomes a supertoxic inland sea that begins to poison the surrounding oceans, lands and atmosphere, leading to the next great extinction event. The supercontinent is encircled by a global ocean, the Propanthalassic Ocean (meaning "future" Panthalassic Ocean), which encircles half the Earth.

Models 
There are two models for the formation of Pangaea Proxima - an early model and the current model. The two models differ in where they place Australia, Antarctica and Chukotka:

The early model, created in 1982 and shown on the Paleomap Project website, places Australia and Antarctica connected to each other as a separate landmass to Pangaea Proxima, close to the South Pole, and Chukotka staying with Eurasia.

The current model, created in 2001 and shown on Christopher Scotese's YouTube channel, has Australia attached to China, East Antarctica attached to South America, and West Antarctica attached to Australia, with Chukotka attached to North America (it is on the North American plate).

Other suggested supercontinents
Paleogeologist Ronald Blakey has described the next 15 to 85 million years of tectonic development as fairly settled and predictable, without supercontinent formation. Beyond that, he cautions that the geologic record is full of unexpected shifts in tectonic activity that make further projections "very, very speculative". In addition to Pangaea Proxima, two other hypothetical supercontinents—"Amasia" and "Novopangaea"—were illustrated in an October 2007 New Scientist article. Another supercontinent, Aurica, has been suggested in more recent times.

In the latest research, scientists discovered that Earth is undergoing certain unimaginable changes. The world might develop a new 'supercontinent' within 200 million to 300 million years as the Pacific Ocean is seen to be shrinking and closing. As per a Complex report, researchers from Curtin University in Australia and Peking University in China predicted that the Pacific Ocean's eventual disappearance would result in a geological reconfiguration of the planet.

The study, which has been published in the National Science Review, emphasises how the world's oldest and largest ocean started shrinking at the time of the dinosaurs and is still losing a few millimeters each year. This process, together with the shifting of tectonic plates, will result in the construction of the "Amasia" supercontinent.

See also 

 The Future Is Wild, television series which explores future evolution, including on Pangaea Proxima

References

Further reading
 Nield, Ted, Supercontinent: Ten Billion Years in the Life of Our Planet, Harvard University Press, 2009,

External links
Four possible future supercontinents
What Will Earth Look Like When the Next Supercontinent Forms? - NewsWeek

Future supercontinents